Canada competed at the 2013 Summer Universiade in Kazan, Russia. The team won a total of 16 medals, including  2 gold.

Medalists

Athletics

Canada was represented by fifty-two athletes.

Badminton

Canada was represented by six male and five female badminton players.

Men

Women

Basketball

Canada has qualified both a men's and a women's team.

Men
The men's team will participate in Group C.

Preliminary round

|}

Elimination round

Women
The women's team will participate in Group C.

Team roster
The women's team roster is as follows:

|}
| valign="top" |
 Head coach
  (Cape Breton University)
 Assistant coaches
  (University of Toronto)
  (University of Windsor)
 Team Manager
  (University of New Brunswick)
 Therapist
 

Legend
 (C) Team captain
 nat field describes country of university
 Age field is age on July 7, 2013
|}

Preliminary round

|}

Elimination rounds

Beach volleyball

Canada will be represented by one men's team and two women's teams.

Men

Women

Fencing

Canada will be represented by sixteen fencers.

Men

Women

Football

Canada will be represented by both a men's and a women's football team.

Men
The men's team will participate in Pool D.

Team roster
The team roster is as follows:

Head coach: Pat Raimondo, Université de MontréalAssistant coaches: Rock Basacco, Western University; Randy Bardock, University of Lethbridge

Preliminary round

Women
The women's team will participate in Group B.

Team roster
The team roster is as follows:

Head coach: Liz Jepsen, University of AlbertaAssistant coach: Steve Johnson, University of Ottawa

Preliminary round

Gymnastics

Canada will be represented in both artistic gymnastics and rhythmic gymnastics.

Artistic gymnastics
Ten gymnasts will compete in the artistic gymnastics competition.

Rhythmic gymnastics
Two gymnasts will compete in the rhythmic gymnastics competition.

Rugby sevens

Canada will be represented by both a men's and a women's rugby sevens team.

Men
The men's team will participate in Group A.

Team roster
The team roster is as follows:

Head coach: Sean McDonaugh, Royal Military College of CanadaAssistant coach: Cory Hector, University of Guelph

Preliminary round

Women
The women's team will participate in Group A.

Team roster
The team roster is as follows:

Head coach: Matt Parrish, University of AlbertaAssistant coach: Joe Costello, York University

Preliminary round

Shooting

Canada will be represented by three shooters.

Men

Women

Swimming

Canada will be represented by thirty-eight swimmers.

Synchronized swimming

Canada will be represented by eight synchronized swimmers.

Volleyball

Canada has qualified both a men's and a women's team.

Men
The men's team will participate in Group D.

Team roster
The team roster is as follows:

Head coach: Larry McKay, University of WinnipegAssistant coach: Steve Leknois, Royal Military College of Canada; Tilen Kozamernik, Arkas Spor Izmir

Preliminary round

|}

|}

Women
The women's team will participate in Group B.

Team roster
The team roster is as follows:

Head coach: Arnd Ludwig, Volleyball CanadaAssistant coach: Olivier Trudel, Université de Montréal

Preliminary round

|}

|}

Water polo

Canada has qualified both a men's team and a women's team.

Men
The men's team will participate in Group A.

Team roster
The team roster is as follows:

Head coach: Michel RoyAssistant coach: Robert Couillard

Preliminary round

Women
The women's team will participate in Group A.

Team roster
The team roster is as follows:

Head coach: Andrew RobinsonAssistant coach: Justin Mitchell

Preliminary round

Weightlifting

Canada will be represented by six male and three female weightlifters.

Men

Women

Wrestling

Canada will be represented by five male and seven female wrestlers.

Men
Freestyle

Women
Freestyle

References

Nations at the 2013 Summer Universiade
2013 in Canadian sports
Canada at the Summer Universiade